An exoskeleton (from Greek  éxō "outer" and  skeletós "skeleton") is an external skeleton that supports and protects an animal's body, in contrast to an internal skeleton (endoskeleton) in for example, a human. In usage, some of the larger kinds of exoskeletons are known as "shells". Examples of exoskeletons within animals include the arthropod exoskeleton shared by chelicerates, myriapods, crustaceans, and insects, as well as the shell of certain sponges and the mollusc shell shared by snails, clams, tusk shells, chitons and nautilus. Some animals, such as the turtle, have both an endoskeleton and an exoskeleton.

Role 
Exoskeletons contain rigid and resistant components that fulfill a set of functional roles in many animals including protection, excretion, sensing, support, feeding and acting as a barrier against desiccation in terrestrial organisms. Exoskeletons have a role in defense from pests and predators, support and in providing an attachment framework for musculature.

Arthropod exoskeletons contain chitin; the addition of calcium carbonate makes them harder and stronger, at the price of increased weight. Ingrowths of the arthropod exoskeleton known as apodemes serve as attachment sites for muscles. These structures are composed of chitin and are approximately six times stronger and twice the stiffness of vertebrate tendons. Similar to tendons, apodemes can stretch to store elastic energy for jumping, notably in locusts. Calcium carbonates constitute the shells of molluscs, brachiopods, and some tube-building polychaete worms. Silica forms the exoskeleton in the microscopic diatoms and radiolaria. One species of mollusc, the scaly-foot gastropod, even makes use of the iron sulfides greigite and pyrite.

Some organisms, such as some foraminifera, agglutinate exoskeletons by sticking grains of sand and shell to their exterior. Contrary to a common misconception, echinoderms do not possess an exoskeleton, as their test is always contained within a layer of living tissue.

Exoskeletons have evolved independently many times; 18 lineages evolved calcified exoskeletons alone. Further, other lineages have produced tough outer coatings analogous to an exoskeleton, such as some mammals. This coating is constructed from bone in the armadillo, and hair in the pangolin. The armor of reptiles like turtles and dinosaurs like Ankylosaurs is constructed of bone; crocodiles have bony scutes and horny scales.

Growth 

Since exoskeletons are rigid, they present some limits to growth. Organisms with open shells can grow by adding new material to the aperture of their shell, as is the case in snails, bivalves and other molluscans. A true exoskeleton, like that found in arthropods, must be shed (moulted) when it is outgrown. A new exoskeleton is produced beneath the old one. As the old one is shed, the new skeleton is soft and pliable. The animal will typically stay in a den or burrow for this time,  as it is quite vulnerable during this period. Once at least partially set, the organism will plump itself up to try to expand the exoskeleton. The new exoskeleton is still capable of growing to some degree, however.  Animals of the order arthropoda, like lizards, amphibians, and many other animals that shed their skin, are indeterminate growers. Animals that are indeterminate growers grow in size continually throughout their life because, in this case, their exoskeleton is always being replaced. Failure to shed the exoskeleton once outgrown can result in the animal being suffocated within its own shell, and will stop subadults from reaching maturity, thus preventing them from reproducing. This is the mechanism behind some insect pesticides, such as Azadirachtin.

Paleontological significance 

Exoskeletons, as hard parts of organisms, are greatly useful in assisting preservation of organisms, whose soft parts usually rot before they can be fossilized. Mineralized exoskeletons can be preserved "as is", as shell fragments, for example. The possession of an exoskeleton  permits a couple of other routes to fossilization. For instance, the tough layer can resist compaction, allowing a mold of the organism to be formed underneath the skeleton, which may later decay. Alternatively, exceptional preservation may result in chitin being mineralized, as in the Burgess Shale, or transformed to the resistant polymer keratin, which can resist decay and be recovered.

However, our dependence on fossilized skeletons also significantly limits our understanding of evolution. Only the parts of organisms that were already mineralized are usually preserved, such as the shells of molluscs. It helps that exoskeletons often contain "muscle scars", marks where muscles have been attached to the exoskeleton, which may allow the reconstruction of much of an organism's internal parts from its exoskeleton alone. The most significant limitation is that, although there are 30-plus phyla of living animals, two-thirds of these phyla have never been found as fossils, because most animal species are soft-bodied and decay before they can become fossilized.

Mineralized skeletons first appear in the fossil record shortly before the base of the Cambrian period, . The evolution of a mineralized exoskeleton is seen by some as a possible driving force of the Cambrian explosion of animal life, resulting in a diversification of predatory and defensive tactics. However, some Precambrian (Ediacaran) organisms produced tough outer shells while others, such as Cloudina, had a calcified exoskeleton.
Some Cloudina shells even show evidence of predation, in the form of borings.

Evolution 

On the whole, the fossil record only contains mineralised exoskeletons, since these are by far the most durable. Since most lineages with exoskeletons are thought to have started out with a non-mineralised exoskeleton which they later mineralised, this makes it difficult to comment on the very early evolution of each lineage's exoskeleton. It is known, however, that in a very short course of time, just before the Cambrian period, exoskeletons made of various materials – silica, calcium phosphate, calcite, aragonite, and even glued-together mineral flakes – sprang up in a range of different environments. Most lineages adopted the form of calcium carbonate which was stable in the ocean at the time they first mineralised, and did not change from this mineral morph - even when it became the less favorable.

Some Precambrian (Ediacaran) organisms produced tough but non-mineralized outer shells, while others, such as Cloudina, had a calcified exoskeleton, but mineralized skeletons did not become common until the beginning of the Cambrian period, with the rise of the "small shelly fauna". Just after the base of the Cambrian, these miniature fossils become diverse and abundant – this abruptness may be an illusion, since the chemical conditions which preserved the small shellies appeared at the same time. Most other shell-forming organisms appear during the Cambrian period, with the Bryozoans being the only calcifying phylum to appear later, in the Ordovician. The sudden appearance of shells has been linked to a change in ocean chemistry which made the calcium compounds of which the shells are constructed stable enough to be precipitated into a shell. However this is unlikely to be a sufficient cause, as the main construction cost of shells is in creating the proteins and polysaccharides required for the shell's composite structure, not in the precipitation of the mineral components. Skeletonization also appeared at almost exactly the same time that animals started burrowing to avoid predation, and one of the earliest exoskeletons was made of glued-together mineral flakes, suggesting that skeletonization was likewise a response to increased pressure from predators.

Ocean chemistry may also control which mineral shells are constructed of. Calcium carbonate has two forms, the stable calcite, and the metastable aragonite, which is stable within a reasonable range of chemical environments but rapidly becomes unstable outside this range. When the oceans contain a relatively high proportion of magnesium compared to calcium, aragonite is more stable, but as the magnesium concentration drops, it becomes less stable, hence harder to incorporate into an exoskeleton, as it will tend to dissolve.

With the exception of the molluscs, whose shells often comprise both forms, most lineages use just one form of the mineral. The form used appears to reflect the seawater chemistry – thus which form was more easily precipitated – at the time that the lineage first evolved a calcified skeleton, and does not change thereafter. However, the relative abundance of calcite- and aragonite-using lineages does not reflect subsequent seawater chemistry – the magnesium/calcium ratio of the oceans appears to have a negligible impact on organisms' success, which is instead controlled mainly by how well they recover from mass extinctions. A recently discovered modern gastropod Chrysomallon squamiferum that lives near deep-sea hydrothermal vents illustrates the influence of both ancient and modern local chemical environments: its shell is made of aragonite, which is found in some of the earliest fossil mollusks; but it also has armor plates on the sides of its foot, and these are mineralized with the iron sulfides pyrite and greigite, which had never previously been found in any metazoan but whose ingredients are emitted in large quantities by the vents.

See also 
 Spiracle – small openings in the exoskeleton that allow insects to breathe
 Hydrostatic skeleton
 Endoskeleton
 Powered exoskeleton
 Osteoderm

References

External links 

Animal anatomy
Biomechanics
Skeletons